Chartreuse, also known as yellow-green or greenish yellow, is a color between yellow and green. It was named because of its resemblance to the green color of a French liqueur called green chartreuse, introduced in 1764. Similarly, chartreuse yellow is a yellow color mixed with a small amount of green; it was named because of its resemblance to the color of a similar French liqueur called yellow chartreuse.

Shades

History and etymology
The French word chartreuse means "charterhouse".  The monasteries of the monks of the Carthusian order, of which the first one was established in 1082 by Saint Bruno, are called charter houses because they were chartered—and given generous material support—by the Duke of Burgundy, known as Philip the Bold, when he took over the area in 1378. Philip the Bold's elaborately decorated tomb was initially installed at a Carthusian charterhouse when he died in 1404. These monks started producing Chartreuse liqueur in 1764.

In nature
Yellow-green algae, also called Xanthophytes, are a class of algae in the Heterokontophyta division. Most live in fresh water, but some are found in marine and soil habitats. They vary from single-celled flagellates to simple colonial and filamentous forms. Unlike other heterokonts, the plastids of yellow-green algae do not contain fucoxanthin, which is why they have a lighter color.

In popular culture

Traffic safety 
Chartreuse yellow is used on traffic safety vests to provide increased visibility for employees working near traffic. The chartreuse yellow background material, together with a retro-reflective satisfy the ANSI 107-2010 standard since 1999. High-visibility clothing ANSI Standards were adopted as an Occupational Safety and Health Act (United States) requirement in 2008.

Film and television
The 1960 Universal film Chartroose Caboose featured a "bright green"-colored train car.

Firefighting

Since about 1973, a sort of fluorescent chartreuse green has been adopted as the color of fire engines in parts of the United States and elsewhere. The use of chartreuse fire engines began when New York ophthalmologist Stephen Solomon produced research claiming that sparkling bright lime-green paint would boost the night-time visibility of emergency vehicles compared to those painted the traditional fire engine red. The reason for this is the Purkinje effect, i.e., the cones do not function as efficiently in dim light, so red objects appear to be black. In Australia and New Zealand this form of chartreuse yellow is also known as "ACT yellow" as this is the color of the fire engines in the Australian Capital Territory.

See also
 Lime (color)
 Lists of colors

References

External links
 

Tertiary colors
Quaternary colors
Shades of green